Panfilovo is a rural locality (a selo) in Novoromanovsky Selsoviet, Kalmansky District, Altai Krai, Russia. The population was 329 as of 2013. There are 6 streets.

Geography 
Panfilovo is located 35 km northwest of Kalmanka (the district's administrative centre) by road. Novoromanovo is the nearest rural locality.

References 

Rural localities in Kalmansky District